"Dreaming of You" is a song by English band the Coral from their eponymous debut album, The Coral. Released on 7 October 2002, it was the third single taken from the album and charted at number 13 on the UK Singles Chart. In October 2011, NME placed it at number 85 on its list "150 Best Tracks of the Past 15 Years".

A live version was also included on the Radio 1's Live Lounge album.

Track listings

Personnel
The Coral
 James Skelly – vocals, guitar, co-producer
 Lee Southall – guitar, vocals on "Follow the Sun" and "Another Turn in the Lock", co-producer
 Bill Ryder-Jones – guitar, trumpet, co-producer
 Paul Duffy – bass guitar, saxophone, co-producer
 Nick Power – keyboards, co-producer
 Ian Skelly – drums, co-producer, artwork

Production
 Ian Broudie – producer
 Jon Gray – engineer
 Kenny Patterson – assistant engineer

Other personnel
 Laurence Easeman – video director

Use in media
 The Channel 4's Free Agents used "Dreaming of You" during the ending credits of Episode 3.
 "Dreaming of You" was used in Scrubs season 2 episode 10 "My Monster"
 It was replaced with "Dirty Minds" by Here Come The Mummies on streaming
 The song is a playable track on the video game Lego Rock Band.
 The song featured in adverts for Asda in 2019; since then a sample of the song has been used at the end of the subsequent Asda adverts in sync with the chain's trademark rear pocket tap.
 Featured in the film Sex Lives of the Potato Men.

Charts

Certifications

References

External links
 
 
 
 

2002 singles
The Coral songs
2002 songs
Songs written by James Skelly
Song recordings produced by Ian Broudie
Deltasonic singles